The Association for the Defence of the Memory of Marshal Pétain (Association pour défendre la mémoire du maréchal Pétain or ADMP) is a French association set up on 6 November 1951 under the patronage of general Maxime Weygand, its honorary president until his death in 1965.

History
It was the successor to a "comité d'honneur", set up in 1948 by Marshal Philippe Pétain to campaign for his release from prison and quickly banned. This group was presided over by the historian Louis Madelin. The new group was established in 1951 following Petain's death and was effectively led by prominent Vichyist lawyer Jacques Isorni who was the driving force behind the group, with Weygand's presidency of the group largely symbolic. The group published a monthly journal, Le Marechal.

Presidents
Pierre Héring
François Lehideux
Jacques le Groignec (2000-2009)

References

Sources
Henry Rousso, "Le syndrome de Vichy, de 1944 à nos jours", Paris, Seuil, coll. "points histoire", 1990, p. 59-65
Site of the ADMP

Political organizations based in France
Far-right politics in France
1951 establishments in France
Organizations established in 1951
Political advocacy groups in France
Philippe Pétain